Rapture is an album by American singer/songwriter Peter Mulvey, released in 1995.

Reception

Writing for Allmusic, critic Darryl Cator wrote of the album, "Mulvey is a talented performer, reaching with all his strength for greatness. Because he hasn't grasped it yet, he appears to be overreaching, but it can be pretty entertaining watching him try."

Track listing
All songs by Peter Mulvey.
"Rapture" – 4:42
"On the Way Up" – 3:40
"Question Mark" – 3:29
"Smell the Future" – 3:26
"The Voice" – 1:00
"So Much More" – 3:11
"If Love Is Not Enough" – 4:40
"The Whole of the Moon" – 5:00
"Half the Time" – 3:33
"Black Rabbit" – 3:02
"Dog Talk" – 1:11
"The Dreams" – 2:42
"Whole of the Moon" – 3:57
"Aurora Boreallis" – 9:23

Personnel
Peter Mulvey – vocals, guitar
David "Goody" Goodrich – guitar, mandolin, dobro, lap steel guitar
Pamela Means – vocals
Jennifer Kimball – vocals
Amy Hartman – vocals

Production notes
Rob Swalley – engineer, photography
Ducky Carlisle – engineer, mixing
Amy Ruppel – design
Jonathan Wyner – mastering
Henk Kooistra – mastering
Phil Antoniades – artwork
Chris McCue – photography

References

Peter Mulvey albums
1995 albums